Stephanie Nadolny is an American voice actress, known for her English dubbing role as the child version of Son Goku, the protagonist of the Dragon Ball series and the child version of Goku's son, Son Gohan, in Dragon Ball Z. She reprised both roles in several Dragon Ball related video games and media. She formerly worked for Funimation and ADV Films.

In 2013, Nadolny voiced K.O. in the pilot of the Cartoon Network Studios original program Lakewood Plaza Turbo and Cartoon Network's OK K.O.! Let's Be Heroes from 2017 to 2018.

Filmography

Animation
 Lakewood Plaza Turbo (2013) – K.O., Gladys
 OK K.O.! Let's Be Heroes – K.O. (Episodes 4, 5, 6, 11, and 43)
 TV Shorts (2016–2017)
 TV Series (2017–2018)

Video games
 OK K.O.! Lakewood Plaza Turbo – K.O. (2016)

Dubbing roles

Voice roles dubbing (as Goku and Gohan in Dragon Ball series)

Series
 Dragon Ball - Goku (Young)
 Dragon Ball Z - Gohan (Young/Teen), Goku (Young) (Flashback)
 Dragon Ball GT - Goku (Young/Baby), Goku Jr., Gohan (Teen) (Flashback)

Films
 Dragon Ball Z: Dead Zone - Gohan
 Dragon Ball Z: The World's Strongest - Gohan
 Dragon Ball Z: The Tree of Might - Gohan
 Dragon Ball Z: Lord Slug - Gohan
 Dragon Ball Z: Cooler's Revenge - Gohan
 Dragon Ball Z: The Return of Cooler - Gohan
 Dragon Ball Z: Super Android 13! - Gohan
 Dragon Ball Z: Broly - The Legendary Super Saiyan - Gohan, Goku (Baby) (Flashback)
 Dragon Ball Z: Bojack Unbound - Gohan
 Dragon Ball Z: Broly – Second Coming - Goku (Baby) (Flashback)
 Dragon Ball: The Path to Power - Goku
 Dragon Ball Z: Battle of Gods - Goku (Young), Gohan (Teen) (Flashback) (archive audio; uncredited)
"Dragon Ball Super: Super Hero" - Gohan (archive audio; uncredited)

TV Specials
 Dragon Ball Z: Bardock - The Father of Goku - Goku (Baby)
 Dragon Ball Z: The History of Trunks - Gohan (Young)
 Dragon Ball GT: A Hero's Legacy - Goku Jr.

Video games
 Dragon Ball series - Goku (Young), Gohan (Young/Teen) (2002–09, 2011)

Other appearances

Anime dubbing
 Beet the Vandel Buster - Additional Voices
 Blue Gender - Additional Voices
 Burst Angel - Additional Voices
 Case Closed - Marlena Xanderbilt (Ep. 101-102)
 Dragon Ball series - East Kai, Trunks (Baby), Miss Beakman/Hamilton, Idasa and Ikose's Mother, Cargo, Angel, Chiobi
 Fruits Basket (2001) - Ari (Ep. 21)
 The Galaxy Railways - Charlie (Ep. 8)
 Gravion Zwei - Faye Xin Yu
 Hakugei: Legend of the Moby Dick - Atre
 Hell Girl - Bully (Ep. 25)
 Kanon (2006) - Alarm Clock (Ep. 2, 18), Track Team Girl 2 (Ep. 2), Track Girls, Classmates (Ep. 2), Chatty Girls, Kimono Girls, Waitress (Ep. 1)
 Kiddy Grade - Additional Voices
 Kodocha - Additional Voices
 Lupin the 3rd: Missed by a Dollar - Cynthia Fullerton
 Parasite Dolls - Eve
 Pumpkin Scissors - Royal Maid (Ep. 2), Proprietress (Ep. 9)
 Yu Yu Hakusho - Dark Tournament Intercom (Ep. 36-37), Keiko's Friend (Ep. 1-2), Nurse (Ep. 73), Shishi Fangirl (Blu-ray; Ep. 47), Takai (originally; ep 73)

Misc.
 Chuck E. Cheese's - Helen Henny (1994-1995)

External links
 
 
 
 Mania.com's Interview with Stephanie Nadolny

Living people
American child actresses
American video game actresses
American voice actresses
Animal impersonators
20th-century American actresses
21st-century American actresses
Year of birth missing (living people)
Place of birth missing (living people)